Rehaset Mehari (born March 5, 1989 in Agertsiot) is an Eritrean long-distance runner. She competed in the marathon at the 2012 Summer Olympics, placing 59th with a time of 2:35:49.

References

1989 births
Living people
Eritrean female long-distance runners
Olympic athletes of Eritrea
Athletes (track and field) at the 2012 Summer Olympics